The Saint Gayane Church (pronounced Surb Gayane) is a 7th-century Armenian church in Vagharshapat (Etchmiadzin), the religious center of Armenia.  It is located within walking distance from the Etchmiadzin Cathedral of 301. St. Gayane was built by Catholicos Ezra I in the year 630. Its design has remained unchanged despite partial renovations of the dome and some ceilings in 1652.

Gayane was the name of an abbess who was martyred with other nuns by Tiridates III of Armenia in the year 301, and subsequently made a saint of the Armenian Apostolic Church.

In 2000, Saint Gayane Church was listed in the UNESCO World Heritage Sites along with historical churches of Vagharshapat.

History
Saint Gayane Church sits on the site where the aforementioned saint was martyred during the time of the conversion of Armenia to Christianity in the year 301 AD. The fifth century Armenian historian Agathangelos wrote that the young and beautiful Hripsime, who at the time was a Christian nun in Rome, was to be forcefully married to the Roman emperor Diocletian. She and the abbess Gayane among other nuns fled the tyrant emperor and left to Armenia. The pagan Armenian King Trdat received a letter from Diocletian in which he described her beauty. Trdat discovered where the nuns were hiding, and fell in love with Hripsime and later Gayane. After her refusal of his advances, Hripsime was tortured and martyred at the location of Saint Hripsimé Church, while Gayane was tortured and martyred at this site where the church was later built. The remaining group of thirty-eight unnamed nuns were martyred at the location of Shoghakat Church. During the time that Hripsime was being tortured, Gayane told her to "be of good cheer, and stand firm" in her faith. King Trdat was to be later converted to Christianity and made it the official religion of the kingdom.

Architecture
Saint Gayane Church is a three-nave domed basilica with an octagonal drum resting on four internal pillars that divide the interior of the church into three naves. The middle sections of the side naves are elevated slightly over the corner ones and roofed with vaults across the building, forming a transversal nave.  At the eastern wall of the church's interior is a semicircular apse with a rectangular chamber at either side. Three portals lead into the interior of the building. The main portal enters through the arched portico, while two side entries are located at the north and south walls.

The exterior of Saint Gayane differs from the interior in that it has a cruciform-plan gable roof with the drum and dome placed central to the main structure.

An airy, triple-arched portico was added to the western façade of the church in 1683 as the burial place for prominent Armenian clergymen.  The gallery is made up of five distinct yet continuous bays, each being open and linked to the one adjacent. Its three central bays have vaulted ceilings and large arched openings that lead to the exterior courtyard. The two side bays are slightly lower in height and are vaulted as well. Each is surrounded by walls at three sides with small quatrefoil windows placed on the exterior walls. Frescos of clergymen adorn niches along the interior walls of the portico while saints are depicted on the fresco of the tympanum above the main door.  Six-columned cupolas sit on the roof above the two end bays and may be seen from the exterior.

Burials
 Arakel Davrizhetsi
 Lusine Zakaryan
 Daniel Bek-Pirumian

Gallery

See also
 Vagharshapat
 Etchmiadzin Cathedral
 Saint Hripsimé Church
 Zvartnots Cathedral

References

Bibliography

External links

 Saint Gayane Church
 Armenica.org: Church of S. Gayane
 About Saint Gayane Church

7th-century churches in Armenia
Armenian Apostolic churches in Vagharshapat
Oriental Orthodox congregations established in the 7th century
World Heritage Sites in Armenia
Tourist attractions in Armavir Province
Churches completed in 630